Marina Pushkareva (born 24 August 1989) is a Russian footballer.

Pushkareva played for the club Kubanochka Krasnodar in the Russia women's national football team.

References

1989 births
Living people
Russian women's footballers
Women's association football defenders
Kubanochka Krasnodar players
Universitet Vitebsk players
Expatriate women's footballers in Belarus